(died 1513) was a Japanese samurai of the Sengoku period, who ruled an area of central Shinano Province (modern-day Nagano Prefecture). He was allied with Nagao Tamekage.

Family
His father was Takanashi Masataka; his son was Takanashi Sumiyori.
He was the grandfather of Takanashi Masayori.

References

Takanashi clan
Samurai
1513 deaths
Year of birth unknown